The Premiere Stakes is an Australian Turf Club Group 2 Thoroughbred horse race at Weight for Age for three-year-olds and older run over a distance of 1200 metres at Randwick Racecourse, Sydney, Australia.  Prize money is A$1,000,000.

History
The race originally was scheduled in mid August but after the merging of the Australian Jockey Club and Sydney Turf Club the race was moved in 2011 to early October and is part of the Epsom Handicap racecard.

Grade
 1972–1978 - Listed race
 1979–1996 - Group 3
 1997 onwards Group 2

Distance
 1972–1975 - 1300 metres
 1976 onwards - 1200 metres

Venue
 1972–1983 - Rosehill Racecourse
 1984 - Canterbury Park Racecourse
 1985–1992 - Rosehill Racecourse
 1993 - Canterbury Park Racecourse
 1994–2010 - Rosehill Racecourse
 2011 onwards - Randwick Racecourse

Winners		

 2022 - Lost And Running
 2021 - Masked Crusader
 2020 - Libertini
 2019 - Brutal
 2018 - Santa Ana Lane
 2017 - In Her Time
 2016 - Takedown
 2015 - Terravista
 2014 - Famous Seamus
 2013 - Arinosa
 2012 - Red Tracer
 2011 - Neeson
 2010 - Hot Danish
 2009 - †Mentality / Kroner
 2008 - Triple Honour
 2007 - German Chocolate
 2006 - Paratroopers
 2005 - Shania Dane
 2004 - Spark Of Life
 2003 - Thorn Park
 2002 - Century Kid
 2001 - On Type
 2000 - Mr. Innocent
 1999 - Mr. Innocent
 1998 - Masked Party
 1997 - King Ivor
 1996 - Legal Agent
 1995 - Light Up The World
 1994 - Stormy Regent
 1993 - Klokka
 1992 - Joanne
 1991 - Joanne
 1990 - Integra
 1989 - High Regard
 1988 - Sky Chase
 1987 - Campaign King
 1986 - Imperial Baron
 1985 - Avon Angel
 1984 - March Magic
 1983 - Emancipation
 1982 - Latin Saint
 1981 - Kingston Town
 1980 - Silver Wraith
 1979 - Salaam
 1978 - Monakea
 1977 - Makara
 1976 - Purple Patch
 1975 - Go Mod
 1974 - Favoured
 1973 - Zambari
 1972 - Outback

† Dead heat

See also
 List of Australian Group races
 Group races

References

Horse races in Australia
Open sprint category horse races